Events in the year 1869 in India.

Incumbents
Sir John Lawrence, Viceroy
Richard Bourke, 6th Earl of Mayo, Viceroy (from 12 January)

Events
La Martinière Girls' School is founded in Lucknow.

Law
Divorce Act
East India Irrigation and Canal Act (British statute)
East India Loan Act

Births
11 April – Kasturba Gandhi, wife of Mohandas Karamchand Gandhi (died 1944).
2 October – Mohandas Karamchand Gandhi, political and spiritual leader in India and the Indian independence movement, born (died 1948).

Deaths 
 15 February - Ghalib, Persian and Urdu poet. (b. 27 December 1797)

References 

 
India
Years of the 19th century in India